Doing time is slang for spending time in a jail or prison.

It may also refer to:

 Doing Time (2002 film), also Keimusho no Naka, a 2002 Japanese live-action film
 Doing Time: Life Inside the Big House, a 1991 documentary film
 We're All Doing Time, a book by Bo Lozoff
 Doing Time, the US title of 1979 British film Porridge
 "Doing Time", an episode from the third season of SpongeBob SquarePants
 "Doing Time", a song by Avenged Sevenfold from the 2013 album Hail to the King
 "Doing Time", a song by MxPx from the 1996 album Life in General

See also
 Doing Time, Doing Vipassana, a 1997 Israeli documentary film
 "Doing Time with Ron Kuby", an American talk radio show syndicated by Air America Media